Smiling Friends is an  adult animated television series created by Zach Hadel and Michael Cusack for Cartoon Network's night-time programming block Adult Swim, which revolves around a small company dedicated to making people smile.

The pilot episode aired April 1, 2020, unannounced as part of Adult Swim's annual April Fools' Day event alongside the premiere of Cusack's other series, YOLO. On May 19, 2021, Adult Swim ordered a full season that was initially set to premiere in late 2021. A panel dedicated to the series was held during the Adult Swim Festival on November 12, 2021, where co-creator Zach Hadel mentioned the show will premiere "within a few months", pushing the release schedule ahead to 2022. The first season contains 9 episodes, including the pilot and an 11-minute special. The first season eventually premiered on January 11, 2022, with Adult Swim airing all episodes of the season, except for the special, in one night despite initial plans for a weekly release.

Smiling Friends has become a critical and ratings success, receiving praise for its writing, visuals, tone and humor. The series was renewed for a second season on February 9, 2022.

Premise
The series follows the day-to-day lives and misadventures of a business dedicated to making its customers smile. A pair of employees, cynical Charlie and cheerful, optimistic Pim, try to help out the troubled people who call their company's hotline, though this task usually proves to be more challenging than anticipated due to the often deep-seated nature of their clients' problems.

Voice cast

Main
 Michael Cusack as Pim Pimling / Allan / Mr. Pimling / Bliblie / Demon / Fairies / Grim / Ketchup / Mr. Frog / Pepper / Amy Pimling / Mrs. Pimling / Rex / Warren Buffett
 Marc M. as Mr. Boss / additional voices
 Zach Hadel as Charlie Dompler / Glep / Bliblie / Boss Baby /  DJ Spit / Desmond's Mum / Gnarly / Mip / Mr. Frog Fan / Mr. Peanut / Ronald Reagan / Salt / The Century Egg / The Devil / Charlie’s Grandma / Glep's Grandchild

Recurring
 David Dore as Party Bro / Forest Demon
 Mick Lauer as Bug / Guy at the Gym / Crazy Cup / Elf / additional voices
 Erica Lindbeck as Assistant / Jennifer the Barista / Mustard / The Princess 
 Chris O’Neill as  Smormu / Mr. Frog Auditionee
 Hans van Harken as Jimmy Fallon / Priest / Hell Faces / additional voices
 Rodrigo Huerta as Guy In Line / Jacob the Goblin / additional voices
 Joshua Tomar as Centaur / Grandpa Glep / Cop / additional voices
 Harry Partridge as Smormu Announcer / Grease / 3D Squelton

Guest
 Mike Stoklasa as Desmond / himself
 Finn Wolfhard as Man Living in Wall / various Bliblies
 Nick Wolfhard as Graham Nelly / various Bliblies
 Tom Fulp as Alpha
 Jane Badler as Celebrity Show Host
 David Firth as Shrimp
 Dylan "Chills" as Patron
 Jason Paige as Dream Singer
 Perry Caravello as Simon S. Salty
 Monica Franco as Charlie's girlfriend / Waitress 
 Jim Knobeloch as Mystery Show Host
 Clyde Boraine as Policeman
 Lyle Burruss as Mr. Man
 Gilbert Gottfried as God 
 James Rolfe as himself

Episodes

Production
Smiling Friends was created by animators Zach Hadel and Michael Cusack, noted for their individual successes as content creators for Newgrounds and YouTube. Already well-acquainted with each other online, the pair conceived the idea for the show in 2017 whilst dining at Gus's Chicken in Burbank, California, where Cusack, who is based in Melbourne, Australia, was visiting at the time. Hadel stated in an interview that the pair's goal for the show was to base it around "a group of loveable characters, with a simple kind of concept, which we could take anywhere we wanted to." They settled upon the premise of a hotline for people who were unhappy, which became "the connective tissue that made it all click together." However, Hadel stated that although "the company is an important aspect of the show, it’s really the springboard. We have episodes where it’s not even about the job at all." The pair singled out South Park and Seinfeld as amongst the show's biggest influences. The duo developed the show's art style as a 50/50 blend of their own individual styles, though Cusack noted that his own drawings tend to go through a "final Zach gloss". Early in development, the series went under the working title Little Helpers, with an entirely different cast.

Hadel and Cusack pitched the series to Adult Swim which subsequently greenlit production on the pilot in 2018. Hadel had previously attempted to sell his and Chris O'Neill's webseries Hellbenders to the network, but the project was not picked up while an independently produced pilot was shelved during production. Meanwhile, Cusack created the Rick and Morty short Bushworld Adventures which premiered during an April Fools stunt on the network in 2018, and also created the series YOLO: Crystal Fantasy which premiered on August 10, 2020.

The Smiling Friends pilot, which the pair consider the first official episode, aired on Adult Swim on April 1, 2020, to positive reviews and became the most viewed episode of any show on the network's website. The network subsequently ordered seven additional episodes in May 2021. Serving as showrunners, Hadel and Cusack were hands on in all aspects of production, from writing, storyboards, character designs, final animation and sound design, which the duo considered unusual for an adult animated series. According to Hadel, the budget for the entire first season was equivalent to that of a single episode of Family Guy (an estimated US$2,000,000).

Adult Swim renewed the series for a second season on February 9, 2022.

On May 18, 2022, Hadel announced on Twitter that a special would be released sometime before the second season. A listing for an episode titled "The Smiling Friends Go To Brazil!" appeared on Rotten Tomatoes on July 21, and was confirmed by Hadel and Cusack at Adult Swim's San Diego Comic Con panel the next day. It aired on August 6, 2022.

Broadcast 
The pilot initially premiered on Adult Swim in the United States and Canada on April 1, 2020, during the network's April Fools premiere event.

The series officially premiered on January 10, 2022, at 12:00 a.m. with the episodes "Mr. Frog" and "Shrimp's Odyssey". The rest of the series was then broadcast in an unannounced premiere marathon in its entirety starting from 12:30 a.m. followed by a repeat at 3:00 a.m. The episodes would re-air with two separate episodes airing in the intended premiere slots for the following 4 weeks afterwards, including another marathon on the night of February 13, most likely to pick up viewers tuning away from the end of Super Bowl LVI, as well as to promote the series' availability through HBO Max and the recent news of renewal for the series.

In Canada, the series premiered simultaneously on Adult Swim with new episodes airing weekly. The series later premiered on E4 in the United Kingdom on January 21, 2022, and Adult Swim in France on January 24, 2022.

The series was made available to stream on HBO Max in the United States and StackTV in Canada on February 9.

Notes

References

External links

 
 Smiling Friends at Adult Swim

2022 American television series debuts
2020s American adult animated television series
2020s American animated comedy television series
2020s American black comedy television series
2020s American surreal comedy television series
2020s American workplace comedy television series
Adult Swim original programming
American adult animated comedy television series
American adult computer-animated television series
American stop-motion adult animated television series
American flash adult animated television series
American television series with live action and animation
Australian adult animated comedy television series
Australian computer-animated television series
Australian flash animated television series
Australian television series with live action and animation
2020s Australian animated television series
Television series created by Michael Cusack
English-language television shows
Television series by Williams Street